Mafolie is a settlement on the island of Saint Thomas in the United States Virgin Islands.

Mafolie Great House and Mafolie Hotel are located in Mafolie.

References

Populated places in Saint Thomas, U.S. Virgin Islands
Northside, Saint Thomas, U.S. Virgin Islands